Madagascar is an American computer-animated media franchise owned and produced by DreamWorks Animation. The voices of Ben Stiller, Chris Rock, David Schwimmer and Jada Pinkett Smith are featured in the films. It began with the 2005 film Madagascar, the 2008 sequel Madagascar: Escape 2 Africa and the third film Madagascar 3: Europe's Most Wanted in 2012. A spin off film featuring the penguins, titled Penguins of Madagascar, was released in 2014. A fourth film, Madagascar 4, was announced for 2018, but has since been removed from its schedule due to the studio's restructuring.

The overall plot through the series follows the adventures of four anthropomorphic Central Park Zoo animals who have spent their lives in blissful captivity and are unexpectedly shipped back to Africa (to Madagascar initially). Now they must struggle to survive while attempting to return to New York City with the help of a crafty cadre of penguins and with many other characters along the way. The franchise's films have received mixed-to-positive critical reviews.

Films

Main films

Madagascar (2005)
Madagascar is a 2005 computer animated comedy film and the first film in the series. Directed by Eric Darnell and Tom McGrath, the film tells the story of four Central Park Zoo animals: Alex the lion (Ben Stiller), Marty the zebra (Chris Rock), Melman the giraffe (David Schwimmer) and Gloria the hippo (Jada Pinkett Smith). These animals have spent their lives in comfortable captivity and are unexpectedly shipwrecked on the island of Madagascar.

The film was a commercial success, grossing over $532 million worldwide.

Madagascar: Escape 2 Africa (2008)
Madagascar: Escape 2 Africa is a 2008 computer animated comedy/adventure film and the sequel to the 2005 film Madagascar. Directed by Eric Darnell and Tom McGrath, the film continues the adventures of Alex, Marty, Melman and Gloria, try to fly back to New York, but they crash-land in Africa, where Alex is reunited with his parents Zuba (Bernie Mac) and Florrie (Sherri Shepherd). However, a lion named Makunga (Alec Baldwin) is planning to overthrow Zuba and become alpha lion.

The film grossed over $603 million worldwide, which is higher than its predecessor.

Madagascar 3: Europe's Most Wanted (2012)
Madagascar 3: Europe's Most Wanted is a 2012 computer animated comedy film, and the third installment in the series, directed by Eric Darnell and Tom McGrath, along with Conrad Vernon. Alex, Marty, Gloria and Melman are still struggling to get home to New York. This time, their journey takes them to Europe where they purchase a failing traveling circus as they become close friends with the staff like Stefano the sea lion (Martin Short), Vitaly the tiger (Bryan Cranston), Gia the jaguar (Jessica Chastain) and Sonya the bear (Frank Welker), King Julien's (Sacha Baron Cohen) true love. Together, they spectacularly revitalize the business even as the fanatical Monaco Animal Control officer Captain Chantel DuBois (Frances McDormand) relentlessly pursues them. In the end, the zoo animals finally get back to New York, only to find that they have grown too much in spirit to return to captivity and decide to stay with the circus instead.

The film grossing over $746 million worldwide, marking the highest-grossing film in the series.

Madagascar 4 (TBA)

DreamWorks Animation CEO Jeffrey Katzenberg has stated that there is likely to be a fourth installment in the franchise stating: "Ultimately they will come back to New York and they will come to terms with that, which they will do in this next chapter. Because of the way that movie concludes there’s probably one more for them." However, in June 2012, DreamWorks Animation's head of worldwide marketing, Anne Globe, said, "It's too early to tell. There hasn't been a lot of discussion about that." Eric Darnell, who co-directed all three films, spoke of the possibility of the fourth film, noting, "Two things have to happen. One is that the world has to want Madagascar 4, because if they don't want it, it doesn't matter what we do. And the other thing is even if the world wants Madagascar 4, we have to make sure that we have an idea that is incredible, that is great, that is unexpected. If the audience wants it and we have a great idea, we will see – maybe." On June 12, 2014, the film was scheduled to be released on May 18, 2018. In January 2015, Madagascar 4 was removed from the release schedule following a corporate restructuring and DreamWorks Animation's new policy to release two films a year. In April 2017, Tom McGrath said about the film: "There are things in the works, nothing is announced yet, but I think they'll show their faces once more..."

Spin-off film

Penguins of Madagascar (2014)

A spin-off film featuring the penguins had been in the works since 2005, when the first Madagascar film had been released, with a release date planned for 2009. In March 2011, it was announced that the penguin characters would be given their own feature film, similar to the 2011 Puss in Boots movie, to be directed by Simon J. Smith (the co-director of Bee Movie), produced by Lara Breay and written by Alan J. Schoolcraft and Brent Simons (the writers of DreamWorks' Megamind). In July 2012, at Comic-Con, it was announced that the film, titled The Penguins of Madagascar, would be released in 2015. Robert Schooley, one of the producers of The Penguins series, said that the film will be unrelated to the TV series of the same name, but he did say that could always change. In September 2012, 20th Century Fox and DreamWorks Animation announced the release date for March 27, 2015, and a new pair of writers, Michael Colton and John Aboud. In August 2013, it was reported that Benedict Cumberbatch would voice Agent Classified from the North Wind and John Malkovich the film's charming villain, Dr. Octavius Brine/Dave. On May 20, 2014, the film's release date was moved up to November 26, 2014, switching places with DreamWorks Animation's other film Home.

Television series

The Penguins of Madagascar (2008–2015)
The Penguins of Madagascar is a spin-off television series that aired on Nickelodeon. The series follows the adventures of the four penguins: Skipper (the leader of the group), Kowalski (the smartest), Rico (the craziest) and Private (the youngest) in New York City's Central Park Zoo. The penguins rule the roost at their Central Park habitat, carrying out secret missions in the heart of the city. At times, their missions beckon them to venture outside the zoo. King Julien, the primary antagonist, is also a resident of the zoo (though it is unknown how he, Maurice, and Mort got there) and the penguins must compete against him to maintain order in the zoo. While Tom McGrath, John DiMaggio, Conrad Vernon and Andy Richter reprised their roles as Skipper, Rico, Mason and Mort respectively, Jeff Bennett replaced Chris Miller as Kowalski, James Patrick Stuart replaced Christopher Knights as Private, Danny Jacobs replaced Sacha Baron Cohen as Julien and Kevin Michael Richardson replaced Cedric the Entertainer as Maurice. The series also features a new character, Marlene, an otter voiced by Nicole Sullivan.

All Hail King Julien (2014–2017)
All Hail King Julien is the second spin-off television series. It stars King Julien and set before the events of the first film. The series debuted on December 19, 2014, on Netflix, when the first five 22-minute episodes were released. The series features the voices of Danny Jacobs (replacing Sacha Baron Cohen and reprising his role from The Penguins of Madagascar) as King Julien; Henry Winkler as Julien's regal predecessor, Uncle King Julien; Andy Richter as Mort; Kevin Michael Richardson (replacing Cedric the Entertainer and reprising his role from The Penguins of Madagascar) as Maurice; and India de Beaufort as Clover, the king's special-ops expert.

Madagascar: A Little Wild (2020–2022)
Madagascar: A Little Wild is the third animated spin-off television series that premiered on Hulu and Peacock on September 7, 2020. It's the second prequel in the franchise, centering on the younger versions of the four main characters that first appeared in Madagascar (2005), and the first television series in the franchise starring them (though Alex has made one-off appearances in previous series).

Short films

The Madagascar Penguins in a Christmas Caper (2005)
The Madagascar Penguins in a Christmas Caper is a computer-animated short film, which premiered in theaters on October 7, 2005 with the stop-motion film, Wallace & Gromit: The Curse of the Were-Rabbit. The short was directed by animation veteran Gary Trousdale, produced by Teresa Cheng, and written by Michael Lachance. Set on Christmas Eve, the 12-minute film features four penguins from Central Park Zoo who discover that one of them has gone missing.

Madly Madagascar (2013)
Madly Madagascar is a direct-to-DVD Valentine's Day-themed short film released on January 29, 2013, starring all the main characters from the Madagascar film series. The story appears to take place sometime between the second and third films. It featured many of the same voice actors as the films, including Ben Stiller, Chris Rock, David Schwimmer, and Jada Pinkett Smith. However, voice actor Danny Jacobs once again replaced Sacha Baron Cohen as the voice of the character King Julien. King Julien finds a love potion and starts selling it to members of the watering hole, making Marty attractive to all the animals. Skipper and the penguins organise a rescue mission for his doll girlfriend.

All Hail King Julien: New Year's Eve Countdown (2017)
All Hail King Julien: New Year's Eve Countdown is a three-minute computer-animated film about celebrating the new year in Madagascar.

All Hail King Julien: Happy Birthday to You (2017)
All Hail King Julien: Happy Birthday to You is a one-minute computer animated special.

Television special

Merry Madagascar (2009)
Merry Madagascar is a Christmas special first broadcast on NBC in November 2009, which starred the characters from the Madagascar film series. The story appears to takes place sometime between the first and second films. It featured many of the same voice actors as the films, including Ben Stiller, Chris Rock, David Schwimmer, and Jada Pinkett Smith. However, voice actor Danny Jacobs replaced Sacha Baron Cohen as the voice of the character King Julien. Carl Reiner provided the voice of Santa Claus. Santa Claus crash lands in his sleigh on Madagascar and loses his memory after Alex shoots him down, leaving him, Marty, Gloria and Melman to be Santa for the night. King Julien realizes that Christmas is about giving and not receiving.

Cast and characters

Crew

Reception

Box office performance
The film series has grossed over $2.2 billion, making it the sixth highest-grossing animated franchise (behind Despicable Me, Shrek, Ice Age, Toy Story and The Lion King), and the second highest-grossing DreamWorks Animation franchise (behind Shrek).

Critical and public reception
The series is notable for its steadily improving critical reception, with each mainline film receiving better reviews than the last. Its reception among audiences has remained consistently positive throughout its run.

Critics' Choice Movie Awards

Video games
 Madagascar video game was an adaptation of the first film, released in 2005 by Toys for Bob on the PlayStation 2, Xbox, Microsoft Windows, Nintendo DS, Game Boy Advance and GameCube consoles.
 Madagascar: Operation Penguin was released in 2006 for Game Boy Advance by Activision.
 Madagascar: Animal Trivia DVD Game is an interactive DVD game based on the first film. It was released in 2005 by the b Equal Company. The DVD features over 1,600 questions about animals. The DVD also features Dynamic Leveling which automatically adjusts the difficulty of the questions to each player's knowledge levels. The three levels are Scout Level for 6–9 years, Explorer Levels for 10–13 years and Navigator Level for 14–106 years.
 Madagascar: Escape 2 Africa was an adaptation of the second film and was made for the Xbox 360, PlayStation 3, Wii, PlayStation 2, Microsoft Windows and Nintendo DS and released on November 4, 2008 in North America.
 Madagascar Kartz was released on October 27, 2009 for the Wii, PlayStation 3, Xbox 360 and Nintendo DS.
 The Penguins of Madagascar was released on November 2, 2010 for Nintendo DS.
 The Penguins of Madagascar: Dr. Blowhole Returns – Again! was released on September 6, 2011 for Wii, Xbox 360, PlayStation 3 and Nintendo DS.
 DreamWorks Super Star Kartz was released by Activision on November 15, 2011, for PlayStation 3, Xbox 360, Wii, Nintendo DS and Nintendo 3DS. The game features 14 different characters from the four DreamWorks' films – Madagascar, Shrek, How to Train Your Dragon, and Monsters vs. Aliens.
 Madagascar: Join the Circus!, a mobile video game, was released on June 4, 2012, for iPhone and iPad.
 Madagascar 3: The Video Game was released on June 5, 2012, for Wii, Nintendo 3DS, Nintendo DS, Xbox 360 and PlayStation 3.
 Madagascar Online, a virtual online world within the JumpStart universe, was released on October 4, 2012.
 Madagascar Preschool Surf n' Slide, a mobile learning game, was released by JumpStart on October 4, 2012, on iOS and Android platforms.
 Penguins of Madagascar, a video game based on the film of the same name, was published by Little Orbit and released on November 25, 2014, for Nintendo 3DS, Wii, and Wii U.

Madagascar Live!
There have been multiple live shows based on the franchise.

Madagascar Live! (2011)
Madagascar Live! is a 90-minute theatre show based on the Madagascar film. Produced by DreamWorks Theatricals and Broadway Across America, it was directed by Gip Hoppe as the DreamWorks Animation's second stage production after Shrek the Musical. The tour started on January 28, 2011, in York, Pennsylvania, and was expected to visit more than 70 cities across the United States. After a show in New York's Radio City Music Hall, on April 24, 2011, Madagascar Live! was cancelled in the United States, citing "unforeseen circumstances" as the reason. Madagascar Live! then toured the United Kingdom, visiting nine cities between January 2013 and March 2013.

Madagascar Live! Prepare to Party (2012)

Madagascar Live! Prepare to Party is a 20-minute live stage show featuring Alex, King Julien, Gloria, Mort and The Penguins as they each present their special party games while dancing and singing. The show premiered in 2012 in an Africa area at the UK theme park Chessington World of Adventures, and in DreamWorks Experience at the Australian theme park Dreamworld. The show has now closed at Chessington and only operates at Dreamworld.

Madagascar Live! It's Circus Time (2012)
Madagascar Live! It's Circus Time is a 30-minute live show, based on the film Madagascar 3: Europe's Most Wanted. The story follows the characters of Madagascar to a circus, where they try to avoid being captured by the animal control officer Captain Dubois by blending among its artists, performing stunts, singing and dancing. The show opened in 2012, in Everland Resort, in South Korea, and in 2013 in Heide Park, Germany, and in Gardaland, Italy.

Madagascar Live! Operation: Vacation (2013)
Madagascar Live! Operation: Vacation is a 20-minute live stage show featuring Alex, Gloria, King Julien, Mort and The Penguins along with live singers, a live band and dancers. The show opened in 2013 at Busch Gardens Tampa and SeaWorld San Diego. The show closed at SeaWorld in January 2015 and at Busch Gardens in September 2015.

Madagascar: The Musical (2018)
In 2018, a stage musical titled Madagascar The Musical debuted in the United Kingdom. Since then, it also played in Malaysia, Hong Kong, and New Zealand.

Attractions
Madagascar Madness is one of the three areas at the DreamWorks Experience themed land which is part of Australian theme park Dreamworld. It consists of suspended roller coaster Escape from Madagascar, a show stage King Julien's Theatre in the Wild, a ball play area MAD Jungle Jam and a merchandise shop Madagascar Cargo Hold.

A Madagascar-themed tower called Madagascar Rain Forest with 15 water slides opened at DreamWorks Water Park on October 1, 2020.

Madagascar was one of the seven themed lands in Universal Studios Singapore, and it featured lush tropical jungles as well as a water ride Madagascar: A Crate Adventure and a carousel King Julien's Beach Party-Go-Round. It closed in 2022.

Music
The 1993 music track "I Like to Move It," performed by Reel 2 Real, features prominently in the film series. The first film used a version recorded by Sacha Baron Cohen in character as King Julien. Other versions of the song have been used throughout the franchise, with the lyrics changed or altered to match with each film's plot and the film's subject matter. The original version also appeared in the first and last episode of the Madagascar Netflix series All Hail King Julien and the "Afro Circus/I Like to Move It" tune was played near the start of the Madagascar spin-off film Penguins of Madagascar. The song was also included in the stage adaptation, again sung by King Julien.

References

External links

 

 
Film series introduced in 2005
Children's film series
DreamWorks Animation franchises
Animated film series
Adventure film series
Comedy film franchises